Robert Schley Barrett, Sr. (January 27, 1899 in Atlanta – January 18, 1982 in Atlanta, Georgia) was a third baseman in Major League Baseball.

Early life and education
Robert Schley Barrett was one of seven children born to Robert Pittman Barrett and Lenora Jett Barrett in Atlanta, Georgia. He attended English Avenue Elementary School and Boys High School, finishing his education after the tenth grade.

Career
In 239 games over five seasons, Barrett posted a .260 batting average (169-for-650) with 10 home runs and 86 RBIs.

Personal life
Robert Barrett married the former Ruby Irene Brewer on February 13, 1924. He had at least two children, Robert Schley Barrett, Jr. (1927–1982) and Betty Marlene "Betts" Barrett (1934–2015). He became a steamfitter after his retirement from baseball, and died at the age of 82 in Atlanta. He had one granddaughter, Terri Lynn Barrett.

Sources

1899 births
1982 deaths
Baseball players from Atlanta
Major League Baseball third basemen
Chicago Cubs players
Brooklyn Robins players
Boston Red Sox players
Little Rock Travelers players
Pittsfield Hillies players
Memphis Chickasaws players
Buffalo Bisons (minor league) players
Newark Bears (IL) players
Fort Worth Cats players
Jersey City Skeeters players
Augusta Tigers players